Olejnik is a Polish-language surname; it may refer to:
 Bobby Olejnik (born 1986), Austrian professional footballer
 Craig Olejnik
 Małgorzata Olejnik
 Marián Olejník
 Monika Olejnik
 Olga Oleinik
 Robert Olejnik (pilot)

See also
 
Olenik
Oleynik, Russian version
Oliynyk, Ukrainian version